Muricanthus is a genus of sea snails, marine gastropod mollusks in the family Muricidae, the murex snails or rock snails.

The name Muricanthus was previously considered a synonym of Hexaplex (Muricanthus) Swainson, 1840 represented as Hexaplex Perry, 1810

Species
Species within the genus Muricanthus :
 Muricanthus ambiguus (Reeve, 1845)
 Muricanthus callidinus Berry, 1958
 Muricanthus nigritus (Philippi, 1845)
 Muricanthus radix (Gmelin, 1791)
 Muricanthus strausi (A. H. Verrill, 1950)

Species brought into synonymy
 Muricanthus kusterianus (Tapparone-Canefri, 1875): synonym of Hexaplex kuesterianus (Tapparone-Canefri, 1875)
 Muricanthus princeps (Broderip, 1833): synonym of Hexaplex princeps (Broderip, 1833)
 Muricanthus trippae Petuch, 1991: synonym of Hexaplex fulvescens (G.B. Sowerby II, 1834)
 Muricanthus varius (G.B. Sowerby I, 1834): synonym of Chicoreus varius (G.B. Sowerby II, 1834)
 Muricanthus virgineus (Röding, 1798): synonym of Chicoreus virgineus (Röding, 1798)

References

 Verrill, A.H. (1950). A new Murex from the West Indies. Minutes of the Conchological Club of Southern California. 103: 4-5.

External links
 Swainson, W. (1840). A treatise on malacology or shells and shell-fish. London, Longman. viii + 419 pp
 Swainson, W. (1840). A treatise on malacology or shells and shell-fish. London, Longman. viii + 419 pp.
 Fischer, P. (1880-1887). Manuel de conchyliologie et de paléontologie conchyliologique, ou histoire naturelle des mollusques vivants et fossiles suivi d'un Appendice sur les Brachiopodes par D. P. Oehlert. Avec 23 planches contenant 600 figures dessinées par S. P. Woodward.. Paris: F. Savy. Published in 11 parts

Muricinae